"Trapped" is the solo debut single by 2Pac from his debut album 2Pacalypse Now (1991). It deals with police brutality. The first verse tells a story of 2Pac being harassed by the police with one even shooting at him. He then fires back and says he did it because he was tired of constantly being profiled and abused by police officers.

The song samples "Holy Ghost" by Bar-Kays and "The Spank" by James Brown.
"Trapped" was featured on 2Pac's Greatest Hits album in 1998.

Music video
The music video features Shock G singing part of the song's chorus and depicts Shakur in jail. It features a cameo by J-Dee of Da Lench Mob. It appeared as a bonus on the DVD for Tupac: Resurrection. Around the time the music video was debuting, Tupac was assaulted by the Oakland Police Department after he cursed at them for demeaning his name and prolonging the issuing of a ticket sustained during a jaywalking incident.

Track listing 
A1 "Trapped" (LP version) (4:50)
Backing vocals – Dank, Shock G, Wiz
Producer – Pee-Wee
A2 "Trapped" (instrumental mix) (5:26)
Producer – Pee-Wee
B1 "The Lunatic" (LP version) (3:31)
Producer – Shock G
B2 "The Lunatic" (instrumental mix) (3:31)
Producer – Shock G

References

External links 

1991 singles
1991 songs
Tupac Shakur songs
Interscope Records singles
Jive Records singles
Song recordings produced by Shock G
Songs written by Tupac Shakur
Songs about police brutality
Political rap songs